Robert Kraft (born 1941) is an American business magnate.

Robert Kraft is also the name of:
Robert Kraft (writer) (1869–1916), German detective and adventure novelist
Robert Kraft (astronomer) (1927–2015), American astronomer
Robert A. Kraft (born 1934), American historian of religion
Robert Kraft (composer), American songwriter, film composer, recording artist and record producer

See also
Robert Craft (1923–2015), American conductor